In enzymology, a pyridoxal 4-dehydrogenase is an enzyme that catalyzes the chemical reaction

pyridoxal + NAD+  4-pyridoxolactone + NADH + H+

Thus, the two substrates of this enzyme are pyridoxal and NAD+, whereas its 3 products are 4-pyridoxolactone, NADH, and H+.

This enzyme belongs to the family of oxidoreductases, specifically those acting on the CH-OH group of donor with NAD+ or NADP+ as acceptor. The systematic name of this enzyme class is pyridoxal:NAD+ 4-oxidoreductase. This enzyme is also called pyridoxal dehydrogenase. This enzyme participates in vitamin B6 metabolism.

References

 

EC 1.1.1
NADH-dependent enzymes
Enzymes of known structure